Events in the year 2023 in Georgia'.

 Incumbents 

 Events 
20 January - Sagarejo shooting: A man opens fire from a balcony in Sagarejo, Kakheti, killing five people and wounding five others. The gunman later commits suicide.
6 March - The Parliament of Georgia under Georgian Dream passes a new foreign agents law. This begins the 2023 Georgian protests.
7 March - 2023 Georgian protests: Protests occur in Georgia in opposition of a new law regarding foreign agents. Police are reported to be using water cannons and tear gas to control the protesters.
9 March - Georgia's ruling party announces it will withdraw a controversial bill concerning foreign agents which prompted days of protests across the country.
24-26 March: 2023 Judo Grand Slam Tbilisi

 Deaths 
 15 January - Vakhtang Kikabidze, 84, singer, actor (Mimino, Don't Grieve'') and politician, MP (since 2020).
 17 January - Manana Doijashvili, 75, pianist.

References

 
2023 by country
2023 in Asia
2023 in Europe
2020s in Georgia (country)
Years of the 21st century in Georgia (country)